The following is a list of the BirdLife International national partner organisations for each country:

A
Afghanistan – None
Albania – None
Algeria – None
Andorra – None
Angola – None
Antarctica – None
Antigua and Barbuda – None
Argentina – Aves Argentinas
Armenia – None
Australia – BirdLife Australia
Austria – BirdLife Austria
Azerbaijan – None

B
Bahamas – Bahamas National Trust (BNT)
Bahrain – None
Bangladesh – None
Barbados – None
Belarus – None
Belgium – Natagora (Wallonia) and Natuurpunt (Flanders)
Belize - Belize Audubon Society
Benin – None
Bhutan – Royal Society for the Protection of Nature
Bolivia – Asociacion Armonía
Bosnia and Herzegovina – None
Botswana – BirdLife Botswana (BLB)
Brazil – SAVE Brasil
Brunei – None
Bulgaria – Bulgarian Society for the Protection of Birds (BSPB)
Burkina Faso – NATURAMA
Burundi – Association Burundaise pour la protection de la Nature (ABN)

C
Cambodia – BirdLife International Cambodia Programme/NatureLife Cambodia
Cameroon – None
Canada – Birds Canada and Nature Canada
Cape Verde – Biosfera
Central African Republic – None
Chad – None
Chile – Comité Nacional Pro Defensa de la Flora y Fauna (CODEFF)
China – Hong Kong Bird Watching Society
Colombia – Asociación Calidris
Comoros – None
Democratic Republic of the Congo – None
Republic of the Congo – None
Cook Islands – Taporoporo'anga Ipukarea Society
Costa Rica – None
Croatia – Association BIOM
Cuba – Centro Nacional de Áreas Protegidas (CNAP)
Cyprus – BirdLife Cyprus
Czech Republic – Czech Society for Ornithology

D
Denmark – BirdLife Denmark/Dansk Ornitologisk Forening (DOF)
Djibouti – None
Dominica – None
Dominican Republic – Grupo Jaragua (GJI)

E
East Timor – None
Ecuador – Aves y Conservación and Fundación de Conservación Jocotoco (affiliate)
Egypt – Nature Conservation Egypt
El Salvador – Fundación Ecológica Salva Natura
Equatorial Guinea – None
Eritrea – None
Estonia – BirdLife Estonia
Eswatini – None
Ethiopia – The Ethiopian Wildlife and Natural History Society (EWNHS)

F
Falklands Islands (a British overseas territory) - Falklands Conservation
Faroe Islands (a Danish overseas territory) – Faroese Ornithological Society
Fiji – NatureFiji-MareqetiViti
Finland – BirdLife Finland
France – Ligue pour la Protection des Oiseaux
French Polynesia (a French overseas territory) – Société d’Ornithologie de Polynésie (MANU)

G
Gabon – None
Gambia – None
Georgia – Society for Nature Conservation (SABUCO)
Germany – Naturschutzbund Deutschland (NABU)
Ghana – Wildlife Society (GWS)
Gibraltar (a British overseas territory) – Gibraltar Ornithological & Natural History Society (GOHNS)
Greece – Hellenic Ornithological Society (HOS)
Grenada – None
Guatemala – None
Guinea – Guinée-Ecologie
Guinea-Bissau – None
Guyana – None

H
Haiti – None
Honduras – None
Hungary – Magyar Madártani és Természetvédelmi Egyesület (MME)

I
Iceland – Fuglavernd - BirdLife Iceland (ISPB)
India – Bombay Natural History Society
Indonesia – Burung Indonesia
Iran – None
Iraq – Nature Iraq
Ireland – BirdWatch Ireland
Israel – Society for the Protection of Nature in Israel (SPNI)
Italy – Lega Italiana Protezione Uccelli (LIPU)
Ivory Coast – SOS-FORETS (SF)

J
Jamaica – None
Japan – Wild Bird Society of Japan (WBSJ)
Jordan – Royal Society for the Conservation of Nature (RSCN)

K
Kazakhstan – Association for the Conservation of Biodiversity of Kazakhstan (ACBK)
Kenya – NatureKenya
Kiribati – None
Kuwait – Environment Protection Society (KEPS)
Kyrgyzstan – None

L
Laos – None
Latvia – Latvian Ornithological Society (LOB)
Lebanon – The Society for the Protection of Nature in Lebanon (SPNL)
Lesotho – None
Liberia – The Society for Conservation of Nature in Liberia (SCNL)
Libya – None
Liechtenstein – Botanish-Zoologische Gesellschaft (BZG)
Lithuania – Lithuanian Ornithological Society (LOD)
Luxembourg – natur&ëmwelt

M
Madagascar – Asity Madagascar
Malawi – Wildlife and Environmental Society of Malawi (WESM)
Malaysia – Malaysian Nature Society (MNS)
Maldives – None
Mali – None
Malta – BirdLife Malta
Marshall Islands – None
Mauritania – Nature Mauritanie
Mauritius – The Mauritian Wildlife Foundation
Mexico – Pronatura
Micronesia – None
Moldova – None
Monaco – None
Mongolia – None
Montenegro – Center for Protection and Research of birds of Montenegro (CZIP)
Morocco – GREPOM/BirdLife Maroc
Mozambique – None
Myanmar – Biodiversity and Nature Conservation in Myanmar (BANCA)

N
Namibia – None
Nauru – None
Nepal – Bird Conservation Nepal (BCN)
Netherlands – Vogelbescherming Nederland (VBN)
New Caledonia (a French overseas territory) – Société Calédonienne d’Ornithologie (SCO)
New Zealand – Forest & Bird
Nicaragua – None
Niger – None
Nigeria – Nigerian Conservation Foundation (NCF)
North Korea – None
North Macedonia - Macedonian Ecological Society (MES)
Norway – BirdLife Norge

O
Oman – None

P
Pakistan – Ornithological Society of Pakistan
Palau – Palau Conservation Society (PCS)
State of Palestine – Palestine Wildlife Society (PWLS)
Panama – Panama Audubon Society
Papua New Guinea – None
Paraguay – Guyra Paraguay
Peru – Asociación Ecosistemas Andinos
Philippines – Haribon Foundation
Poland – Polish Society for the Protection of Birds (OTOP)
Portugal – Portuguese Society for the Study of Birds (SPEA)
Puerto Rico (a US overseas territory) – Sociedad Ornitológica Puertorriqueña, Inc. (SOPI)

Q
Qatar – None

R
Romania – Romanian Ornithological Society (SOR) / BirdLife Romania
Russia – None
Rwanda – None

S
Saint Kitts and Nevis – None
Saint Lucia – None
Saint Vincent and the Grenadines – None
Samoa – None
San Marino – None
São Tomé and Príncipe – None
Saudi Arabia – None
Senegal – Nature-Communautés-Développement
Serbia – Bird Protection and Study Society of Serbia
Seychelles – Nature Seychelles
Sierra Leone – The Conservation Society of Sierra Leone (CSSL)
Singapore – Nature Society (NSS)
Slovakia – SOS/BirdLife Slovakia
Slovenia – BirdLife Slovenia (DOPPS)
Solomon Islands – None
Somalia – None
South Africa – BirdLife South Africa (BLSA)
South Korea – None
South Sudan – None
Spain – SEO/BirdLife
Sri Lanka – Field Ornithology Group of Sri Lanka (FOGSL)
Sudan – None
Suriname – Foundation for Nature Conservation in Suriname
Sweden – BirdLife Sverige
Switzerland – BirdLife Switzerland
Syria – The Syrian Society for the Conservation of Wildlife (SSCW)

T
Tajikistan – None
Tanzania – Nature Tanzania
Thailand – Bird Conservation Society of Thailand (BCST)
Togo – None
Tonga – None
Trinidad and Tobago – None
Tunisia – Association Les Amis des Oiseaux (AAO)
Turkey – Doğa
Turkmenistan – None
Tuvalu – None

U
Uganda – Nature Uganda
Ukraine – Ukrainian Society for the Protection of Birds (USPB)
United Arab Emirates – None
United Kingdom – Royal Society for the Protection of Birds
United States of America – National Audubon Society and American Bird Conservancy
Uruguay – Aves Uruguay (GUPECA)
Uzbekistan – Uzbekistan Society for the Protection of Birds (UzSPB)

V
Vanuatu – None
Venezuela – None
Vietnam – BirdLife International in Vietnam

Y
Yemen – None

Z
Zambia – BirdWatch Zambia
Zimbabwe – BirdLife Zimbabwe (BLZ)

Sources
Europe and Central Asia
Asia
Middle East
Africa
The Americas
Pacific

Bird conservation organizations
Birdlife International national partner organizations